Foolish is a 1999 comedy drama film directed by Dave Meyers and starring Master P and Eddie Griffin.  It was No Limit Films second theatrical release after I Got the Hook-Up.

Plot
Quentin "Fifty Dollah" Waise  (Master P) is involved in a crime ring that earns him good money but worries his grandmother Odetta  (Marla Gibbs), who dotes on him and encourages him to follow a more righteous path. Fifty Dollah's brother Miles "Foolish" Waise  (Eddie Griffin), who got his nickname from Odetta, is an aspiring comedian, but his inability to get his career going convinces his older sibling he's wasting his talents. The movie pays homage to several of Griffin's idols, such as Redd Foxx, Robin Harris and Sammy Davis, Jr. who appear as feet under restroom stalls while he prepares to perform.

His idols inspire Foolish to do well in his shows, which are widely attended and scheduled last to keep the bar customers drinking, but he has home trouble with his girlfriend and their son, and after the death of his grandmother, seems unable either to keep a gig or to move on. Fifty Dollah tries to give him the push he needs and tries to get his own life in order, but is distracted both by problems with criminal leader Eldorado Ron (Andrew Dice Clay) and by a painful love triangle with his brother and the girl they both like (Amie) (Amy Petersen).

Cast
 Master P as Quentin "Fifty Dollah" Waise 
 Eddie Griffin as Miles "Foolish" Waise 
 Amie Petersen as Desiree
 Frank Sivero as Giovanni 
 Daphne Duplaix as Clarisse
 Jonathan Banks as "Numbers"
 Andrew Dice Clay as Ron "Eldorado Ron"
 Sven-Ole Thorsen as Paris
 Marla Gibbs as Odetta Waise
 Traci Bingham as Simone 
 Bill Nunn as Jimmy Beck
 Clifton Powell as Everette Washington
 AJ Johnson as Himself
 Traequon Tolbert as Miles Waise Jr. 
 Brion James as Ruben Reyes, Talent Scout (uncredited)

Soundtrack

A soundtrack containing hip hop music was released on March 23, 1999 by No Limit Records. It peaked at #32 on the Billboard 200 and #10 on the Top R&B/Hip-Hop Albums.

References

External links

1999 films
1999 comedy-drama films
African-American comedy-drama films
Hood comedy films
Artisan Entertainment films
Films directed by Dave Meyers (director)
1999 directorial debut films
1990s English-language films
1990s American films